Albion Township may refer to:

Canada
 Albion Township, Ontario

United States

Arkansas
 Albion Township, White County, Arkansas, in White County, Arkansas

Indiana
 Albion Township, Noble County, Indiana

Iowa
 Albion Township, Butler County, Iowa
 Albion Township, Howard County, Iowa

Kansas
 Albion Township, Barton County, Kansas
 Albion Township, Reno County, Kansas, in Reno County, Kansas
 Albion Township, Republic County, Kansas

Michigan
 Albion Township, Michigan

Minnesota
 Albion Township, Minnesota

North Dakota
 Albion Township, Dickey County, North Dakota, in Dickey County, North Dakota

Township name disambiguation pages